Aviwe Mgijima (born 10 August 1988) is a South African cricketer. He was included in the Western Province cricket team squad for the 2015 Africa T20 Cup. In August 2017, he was named in Cape Town Knight Riders' squad for the first season of the T20 Global League. However, in October 2017, Cricket South Africa initially postponed the tournament until November 2018, with it being cancelled soon after.

In September 2017, he scored his maiden first-class century playing for Cape Cobras against Knights in the 2017–18 Sunfoil Series, and has since scored a second. In June 2018, he was named in the squad for the Cape Cobras team for the 2018–19 season.

In September 2018, he was named in South Western Districts' squad for the 2018 Africa T20 Cup. In September 2019, he was named in the squad for the Cape Town Blitz team for the 2019 Mzansi Super League tournament. In April 2021, he was named in Western Province's squad, ahead of the 2021–22 cricket season in South Africa.

References

External links
 

1988 births
Living people
Cricketers from East London, Eastern Cape
South African cricketers
Border cricketers
Cape Cobras cricketers
Cape Town Blitz cricketers
South Western Districts cricketers
Western Province cricketers